LPSC can refer to:
 Louisiana Public Service Commission
 Liquid Propulsion Systems Centre, an ISRO India research centre
 Laboratoire de physique subatomique et de cosmologie de Grenoble, a CNRS research centre
 Lunar and Planetary Science Conference